Rui Evora Alves (born 11 August 1970) is a Mozambican footballer. He played in 30 matches for the Mozambique national football team from 1992 to 1998. He was also named in Mozambique's squad for the 1998 African Cup of Nations tournament.

References

External links
 
 

1970 births
Living people
Mozambican footballers
Mozambique international footballers
1996 African Cup of Nations players
1998 African Cup of Nations players
Association football goalkeepers
CD Costa do Sol players